A burin is a steel cutting tool used in engraving, from the French burin (cold chisel). Its older English name and synonym is graver.

Etymology 
The term burin refers to a tool used by engravers that has a thin, pointed blade and is used to etch or cut. The first known use of the word dates back to France in the mid-1600s, when the term was coined for the tool we know today.

Design 

The burin consists of a rounded handle shaped like a mushroom, and a tempered steel shaft coming from the handle at an angle and ending in a very sharp cutting face.

The most ubiquitous types have a square or lozenge face; a high-end repertoire has many others. A tint burin has a square face with teeth, to create many fine, closely spaced lines. A stipple tool allows for the creation of fine dots. A flat burin has a rectangular face, and is used for cutting away large portions of material at a time.

The earliest uses of a burin date to the Lower Paleolithic era. The tool was created and used by early humans to engrave bone, leather, antler, wood, and other dense elements that they encountered. The tool was made from "flakes" of flint: a burin is created when a smaller flake is struck by a larger one, chipping away at the mineral and creating a sharp point. The tool was used alone or with a handle made of animal hide; in later years a wooden handle became common.

Uses 

An engraving burin is used predominantly by intaglio engravers, but also by relief printmakers in making wood engravings. Usually an engraver will have several tools, of different sizes and shapes of cutting face.

The burin is held at approximately 30° to the surface. The index and middle fingers guide the shaft, while the handle is cradled in the palm. The 16th-century Dutch engraver Hendrik Goltzius found his unusually formed hand was well suited for cradling and guiding a burin.

In its earliest uses the burin cut and carved materials to create sketches, or cut meat or thinner materials. Some art from the Lower Paleolithic time period, such as sketches and pictures, can be attributed to the use of the burin as an etching or engraving tool.

Archeology 
Specialists study what typology and technology define a burin, as elements of the tool have been seen through history, ranging from a carved prehistoric tool made of tough minerals to a modern engraver's tool. Prehistoric burins are commonly found in archeological sites from the Lower Paleolithic period. Mostly, the tool was used to carve images. People in the Paleolithic era society were hunter–gatherers and chose locations of living that could be defended against predators and weather.

References

External links 

Printmaking
Chisels